Stepenitz refers to:
Stepenitz (Elbe), river in Brandenburg, Germany
Stepenitz (Trave), river in Mecklenburg-Vorpommern, Germany
Stepenitz, former village in Brandenburg, now part of Marienfließ
Groß Stepenitz and Bad Stepenitz, German names of Stepnica, Poland